Francesco Roccati (9 June 1908 – 25 July 1969) was an Italian long-distance runner. He competed in the marathon at the 1932 Summer Olympics.

References

External links
 

1908 births
1969 deaths
Athletes (track and field) at the 1932 Summer Olympics
Italian male long-distance runners
Italian male marathon runners
Olympic athletes of Italy
Sportspeople from Turin